David Dei (born 20 January 1974) is an Italian association footballer who played as a goalkeeper.

Career
Dei made his Serie A debut on  23 May 1999 against Udinese Calcio.

Dei became Triestina first choice in 2007–08 season, took the place from Generoso Rossi and eventually Rossi left the club in January. But in 2008–09 season, Michael Agazzi became first choice, Dei became backup again.

After retirement Dei became a goalkeeper coach, which he served for Massimo Rastelli in Avellino. They were hired by Cagliari on 12 June 2015.

References

External links
Profile at La Gazzetta dello sport 

Italian footballers
S.S. Arezzo players
ACF Fiorentina players
Benevento Calcio players
A.C. Ancona players
U.S. Pistoiese 1921 players
Empoli F.C. players
F.C. Crotone players
U.S. Triestina Calcio 1918 players
Serie A players
Association football goalkeepers
Sportspeople from Arezzo
1974 births
Living people
Footballers from Tuscany